Alan Stuart Edelman (born June 1963) is an American mathematician and computer scientist. He is a professor of applied mathematics at the Massachusetts Institute of Technology (MIT) and a Principal Investigator at the MIT Computer Science and Artificial Intelligence Laboratory (CSAIL) where he leads a group in applied computing. In 2004, he founded a business called Interactive Supercomputing which was later acquired by Microsoft. Edelman is a fellow of American Mathematical Society (AMS), Society for Industrial and Applied Mathematics (SIAM), Institute of Electrical and Electronics Engineers (IEEE), and Association for Computing Machinery (ACM), for his contributions in numerical linear algebra, computational science, parallel computing, and random matrix theory. He is one of the cocreators of the technical programming language Julia.

Education
An alumnus of Hampshire College Summer Studies in Mathematics, Edelman received B.S. and M.S. degrees in mathematics from Yale University in 1984, and a Ph.D. in applied mathematics from MIT in 1989 under the direction of Lloyd N. Trefethen. Following a year at Thinking Machines Corporation, and at CERFACS in France, Edelman went to U.C. Berkeley as a Morrey Assistant Professor and Levy Fellow, 1990–93. He joined the MIT faculty in applied mathematics in 1993.

Research
Edelman's research interests include high-performance computing, numerical computation, linear algebra, and  random matrix theory.

 In random matrix theory, Edelman is most famous for the Edelman distribution of the smallest singular value of random matrices (also known as Edelman's law), the invention of beta ensembles, and the introduction of the stochastic operator approach, and some of the earliest computational approaches.
 In high performance computing, Edelman is known for his work on parallel computing, as the co-founder of Interactive Supercomputing, as an inventor of the Julia programming language and for his work on the Future Fast Fourier transform. As the leader of the Julialab, he supervises work on scientific machine learning and compiler methodologies.
 In numerical linear algebra, Edelman is known for eigenvalues and condition numbers of random matrices, the geometry of algorithms with orthogonality constraints, the geometry of the generalized singular value decomposition (GSVD), and applications of Lie algebra to matrix factorizations.

Awards
A Sloan fellow, Edelman received a National Science Foundation (NSF) Faculty Career award in 1995. He has received numerous awards, among them the Gordon Bell Prize and Householder Prize (1990), the Chauvenet Prize (1998), the Edgerly Science Partnership Award (1999), the SIAM Activity Group on Linear Algebra Prize (2000), and the Lester R. Ford Award, (2005, with Gilbert Strang).

 In 2011, Edelman was selected a Fellow of SIAM, "for his contributions in bringing together mathematics and industry in the areas of numerical linear algebra, random matrix theory, and parallel computing."
 In 2015, he became a Fellow of the American Mathematical Society "for contributions to random matrix theory, numerical linear algebra, high-performance algorithms, and applications."
 In 2017, he became an IEEE Fellow Class of 2018 "for contributions to the development of technical-computing languages."
In 2019, he was selected as the winner of Sidney Fernbach Award by IEEE Computer Society "for outstanding breakthroughs in high-performance computing, linear algebra and computational science, and for contributions to the Julia programming language."
 In 2021, he became an ACM Fellow of Class 2020 "for contributions to algorithms and languages for numerical and scientific computing."

See also
 Timeline of programming languages
 Julia programming language

References

1963 births
Living people
People from Brooklyn
Hampshire College alumni
Yale College alumni
Massachusetts Institute of Technology School of Science alumni
Massachusetts Institute of Technology School of Science faculty
Fellows of the Society for Industrial and Applied Mathematics
Fellows of the American Mathematical Society
Fellows of the Association for Computing Machinery
Fellow Members of the IEEE
Sloan Research Fellows
Yale Graduate School of Arts and Sciences alumni